Dennie–Marfan syndrome is a syndrome in which there is association of spastic paraplegia of the lower limbs and mental retardation in children with congenital syphilis. Both sexes are affected, and the onset of the disease can be acute or insidious, with slow progression from weakness to quadriplegia. Epilepsy, cataract, and nystagmus may also be found.

The syndrome was described by Charles Clayton Dennie in 1929, and Antoine Marfan in 1936.

References

External links 
 

Neurological disorders
Syndromes with intellectual disability
Syndromes affecting the nervous system
Syndromes caused by microbes